"I Won't Need You Anymore (Always and Forever)" is a song written by Max D. Barnes and Troy Seals, and first recorded by American country music artist George Jones on his 1981 album Still the Same Ole Me, and later recorded by American country music artist Randy Travis. It was released in August 1987 as the second single from his album Always & Forever. It became his fourth number-one hit. It peaked at number one on both the Billboard Hot Country Singles & Tracks and the Canadian RPM Country Tracks chart.

Charts

Weekly charts

Year-end charts

References

1981 songs
1987 singles
George Jones songs
Randy Travis songs
Songs written by Troy Seals
Songs written by Max D. Barnes
Song recordings produced by Kyle Lehning
Warner Records singles